The discography of Saving Abel, an American hard rock band, consists of four studio albums, seven singles and six music videos.

Albums

Studio albums

Extended plays

Singles

Music videos

References

Discographies of American artists
Rock music group discographies